Daniel Leslie Adams (June 19, 1887 – October 6, 1964), nicknamed "Rube", was a Major League Baseball pitcher who played for two seasons. He played for the Kansas City Packers of the Federal League during their two seasons of existence, 1914 and 1915. He played in 47 career games.

External links

1887 births
1964 deaths
Major League Baseball pitchers
Baseball players from Missouri
Kansas City Packers players
Hannibal Cannibals players
Muscatine Camels players
Galesburg Pavers players
Ottumwa Packers players
St. Joseph Drummers players
Davenport Blue Sox players
Rockford Wakes players